Azeglio Terreni (born 26 February 1895, date of death unknown) was an Italian racing cyclist. He rode in the 1927 Tour de France.

References

External links
 

1895 births
Year of death missing
Italian male cyclists
Place of birth missing
Cyclists from Turin